Progressive metal (sometimes shortened to prog metal) is a broad fusion music genre melding heavy metal and progressive rock, combining the loud "aggression" and amplified guitar-driven sound of the former with the more experimental, cerebral or "pseudo-classical" compositions of the latter.

One of these experimental examples introduced to modern metal was djent. The music typically showcases the extreme technical proficiency of the performers and usually uses unorthodox harmonies as well as complex rhythms with frequent meter changes and intense syncopation. 
 
Although the genre emerged towards the late-1980s, it was not until the 1990s that progressive metal achieved widespread success. Queensrÿche, Dream Theater, Tool, Symphony X, Shadow Gallery, King's X, and Fates Warning are a few examples of progressive metal bands who achieved commercial success. Soon after the rise of the genre's popularity, other thrash and death metal bands started to incorporate elements of progressive music in their work.

History
Progressive metal, as a distinct musical style, was primarily advanced by members of the American heavy metal scene of the mid-1980s, particularly Queensrÿche, Fates Warning and then later on, Dream Theater and Symphony X. It has since developed in a non-linear fashion, with countless groups demonstrating innovations in personal ways.

The origins of the genre date back to the very beginning of heavy metal/hard rock and progressive rock when some bands began to merge the two different approaches. 1960s pioneers King Crimson maintained their musical innovation while incorporating a harder approach, using dissonance and experimental tones, yet still maintaining a relationship to the power chords of hard rock, with the main example being "21st Century Schizoid Man". Canadian trio Rush are widely recognized as bridging the gap between hard rock, English progressive rock, and pure heavy metal. Initially influenced by Led Zeppelin, they evolved to combine established progressive rock technique with blues-based power chords. Records such as 2112 (1976) showcased technical expertise and complex compositional skill while still utilizing a more direct and heavier approach than the well-established English progressive rock sound.

1984 brought full-length debut albums from American bands Queensrÿche from Washington state, and Fates Warning from Connecticut. Both expanded their music to include more progressive elements (The Warning, 1984; The Spectre Within, 1985) – some through sound experimentation and compositional refinement, others through extremely complex structures and atypical riffs – up to the two seminal works in 1986: Rage for Order and Awaken the Guardian. In the following years the two bands, while following different paths – more basic and simple the first, more articulate and complex the latter — explore and expand the technical refinement and sonic finesse of their music, continuing to lay the foundations of the genre with important works such as Operation: Mindcrime (1988) by Queensrÿche, and Perfect Symmetry (1989) by Fates Warning.

Progressive metal also found a home in the growing U.S. speed metal movement, influencing popular heavy metal bands like Megadeth, with its acclaimed album Rust in Peace (1990), together with Metallica and its famous album ...And Justice for All (1988). Among the other pioneering thrash metal bands, one of the most important is Canada's Voivod, with their complex and experimental style, full of psychedelic dissonances (Dimension Hatröss, 1988; Nothingface, 1989). "Math-metal" pioneers Watchtower, from Texas, took the concept of time-changes to a new level, combining thrash metal, syncopation and prog in their albums Energetic Disassembly (1985) and Control and Resistance (1989), giving rise to an extremely technical approach based on the rhythmic deconstruction typical in jazz fusion. This same direction in prog metal would be later integrated into death metal by bands such as Atheist (Unquestionable Presence, 1991), which would become known as technical death metal or progressive death metal. Bands which also explored fusion-inspired prog metal include most notably Death and Cynic.

The major US bands that contribute to further delineating and developing the genre are Psychotic Waltz and Dream Theater. The former, with an approach halfway in between Watchtower and Fates Warning, produced A Social Grace (1990), melding their signature sound with the psychedelic Into the Everflow (1992), while the latter explored the legacy of the bands that preceded them while advancing their personal style with When Dream and Day Unite (1989). Both albums focused on keyboards and band members' instrumental skills. As for Dream Theater, their efforts resulted in two fundamental albums, which helped institutionalize classic progressive metal — Images and Words (1992) and Awake (1994).

As for Europe, among the pioneers are Germany's Sieges Even, who, starting out of technical thrash stylistically significant to Watchtower, explored the more technical and angular side of progressive metal with The Art of Navigating by the Stars (2005).

Among the bands of the late 1990s who brought innovation to the genre are the Dutch Ayreon (a project by Arjen Anthony Lucassen) and Swedes Pain of Salvation. Ayreon focused on theatrical and melodramatic rock operas Into the Electric Castle (1998) and The Human Equation (2004), performed by many different members of prominent metal bands. Pain of Salvation was always working towards a more or less unusual style, demonstrated by the eclecticism and anti-conformism found on One Hour by the Concrete Lake (1998), and BE (2004). Forerunners of a more experimental and alternative approach include Thought Industry, as seen in their album Mods Carve the Pig: Assassins, Toads and God's Flesh (1993).

Puerto Rican band Puya rose to prominence in the late '90s with their innovative fusion of jazz, salsa, and progressive metal, evident on their 1999 album Fundamental.

Some of the first bands to pioneer the combination of progressive rock and extreme metal influences were Dan Swanö's Edge of Sanity, and Opeth, both bands hailing from Sweden. In particular, Edge of Sanity's Crimson (1996), a 40-minute concept album consisting of a single track, brought the band critical acclaim and was heralded as one of the first extreme-metal forays into a progressive rock-esque concept album, featuring death-metal vocals and heavily distorted guitars, with guest vocals and lead guitar from Opeth's Mikael Åkerfeldt. Dan Swanö produced Opeth's first release, Orchid (1995), which was unique for its combination of black metal vocals and instrumentation, melodic guitar harmonies, and acoustic passages, but it wasn't until their hallmark record Blackwater Park (2001) that they received critical acclaim. Steven Wilson, progressive rock icon and frontman of Porcupine Tree, was given a copy of Opeth's prior record Still Life (1999) from a friend, and, after listening, noted that the experimental music he had been after had drifted into extreme metal. Being mutual fans of each other's work, Steven ended up co-producing Blackwater Park along with Opeth's frontman Mikael Åkerfeldt, and would go on to co-produce Deliverance (2002) and Damnation (2003), together a would-be double album. Subsequently, Porcupine Tree's music, originally progressive rock with psychedelic elements, would come to be influenced by bands like Opeth and Meshuggah. In particular, Opeth's Ghost Reveries (2005) and Watershed (2008), and Porcupine Tree's In Absentia (2002) and Fear of a Blank Planet (2007) would go on to be highly influential to the later development of the progressive metal genre.

Between the Buried and Me, who started as a more straightforward metalcore band, also began to incorporate both progressive metal and death metal into their music on their 2003 album The Silent Circus, a landmark album in the progressive metalcore genre. They would later add avant-garde elements as well on releases such as The Great Misdirect (2009).

Stylistic diversity
One of the hallmark musical qualities of progressive metal is eclecticism. In between the riffs, choruses, and solos typical of rock and metal songs, prog metal bands often include sections inspired by jazz, classical and Middle Eastern music, among others. Progressive metal is difficult to define specifically, since most bands labeled under the genre have considerably different musical influences when compared to each other.

Similarly, bands such as Dream Theater, Planet X, Puya, Liquid Tension Experiment, The Faceless, Between the Buried and Me and Animals as Leaders have a jazz influence, with extended solo sections that often feature "trading solos". Cynic, Atheist, Opeth, Between the Buried and Me and Meshuggah all blended jazz fusion with death metal, but in dramatically different ways. Devin Townsend draws on more ambient influences in the atmosphere of his music. Progressive metal is also often linked with power metal;  Fates Warning and Conception, two bands that were originally power metal outfits, later incorporated progressive elements that ended up overshadowing their power metal roots. The ProgPower music festivals showcase this progressive-power metal fusion. Recently, with a popularity in shred guitar, the genre of "technical metal" has become increasingly prevalent and popular. This has led to a resurgence of popularity for more traditional progressive metal bands like Dream Theater and Symphony X; it also has led to the inclusion within the progressive niche of bands that do not necessarily play in its traditional style such as thrash/power metal band Nevermore and technical death metal pioneers Obscura. These bands are often labeled progressive since they play complex and technical music which does not fall under any other genre.

In the late 2000s, bands such as Periphery, Tesseract, Animals as Leaders and Vildhjarta popularized the "djent" style of progressive metal in a sound originally developed by Meshuggah. It is characterized by high-attack, palm-muted, syncopated riffs (often incorporating polymeters), as well as use of extended-range guitars. Extended-range guitars also feature in other forms of progressive metal; artists including Dream Theater, Devin Townsend, Dir En Grey, and Ne Obliviscaris have used seven-string guitars without being part of the djent movement, Dream Theater having been one of the earliest progressive metal bands to incorporate seven-stringed guitars into their music.

Proyecto Eskhata, a Spanish band, has received much press coverage in Spain for its fusion of progressive rock and rap metal, which journalists have described as "progressive rap metal".

Progressive doom is a fusion genre that combines elements of progressive metal and doom metal. Bands include King Goat, Below the Sun, Sierra, and Oceans of Slumber.

See also
 Heavy metal subgenres
 List of progressive metal artists
 Timeline of progressive rock

References

References
 The Absolute Guide To Progressive Metal by Rocking.gr.
 

 
Heavy metal genres
Progressive rock
Metal
Fusion music genres
American rock music genres
American styles of music
British rock music genres